Darius Alonzo Moore (April 13, 1833 – June 26, 1905) was an American merchant and politician from New York.

Life
He was born in canton, New York, the son of John W. Moore (born 1800) and Almira (Farr) Moore (born 1811). He attended Gouverneur Wesleyan Seminary. Then he became a merchant. On July 17, 1856, he married Emily Beebe (1834–1908), and they had several children.

He was Clerk of the Town of De Kalb until 1865; and Supervisor of the Town of De Kalb from 1867 to 1875.

He was a member of the New York State Assembly (St. Lawrence Co., 1st D.) in 1872 and 1873.

He was a member of the New York State Senate (17th D.) in 1876 and 1877.

He was buried at the Bayside Cemetery in Potsdam, New York.

Sources
 Life Sketches of Executive Officers and Members of the Legislature of the State of New York by William H. McElroy & Alexander McBride (1873; pg. 257f)
 History of De Kalb, NY transcribed from Our County and Its People: A Memorial Record of St. Lawrence County, New York by Gates Curtis (1894)
 Moore genealogy at RootsWeb

External links

1833 births
1905 deaths
Republican Party New York (state) state senators
People from Canton, New York
Republican Party members of the New York State Assembly
Town supervisors in New York (state)
People from De Kalb, New York
19th-century American politicians